Casco Viejo (Spanish for Old Quarter), also known as Casco Antiguo or San Felipe, is the historic district of Panama City. Completed and settled in 1673, it was built following the near-total destruction of the original Panamá city, Panamá Viejo in 1671, when the latter was attacked by pirates. It was designated a World Heritage Site in 1997.

History
Panama City was founded on August 15, 1519 and it lasted one hundred and fifty-two years. In January 1671, the Governor Juan Perez de Guzman had it set on fire, before the attack and looting by the pirate Henry Morgan. In 1672, Antonio Fernández de Córdoba initiated the construction of a new city, which was then founded on January 21, 1673. This city was built on a peninsula completely isolated by the sea and a defensive system of walls. Today this place preserves the first institutions and buildings of the modern city of Panama. It is known as Casco Viejo (Spanish for Old Town).

In recent years, Casco Viejo— through gentrification— has become a tourist hotspot filled with restaurants, boutique hotels, and nightclubs; while also maintaining the multiple historical sites it has to offer.

Main sights
La Catedral Metropolitana is the main Catholic church in Panama city.
El Palacio de las Garzas, is the governmental office and residence of the President of Panama.
Church and Convent of San Francisco de Asís.
Church of San José
Church of La Merced
Church and Convent of Santo Domingo: Arco Chato
Church and convent of the Society of Jesus.
Palacio Municipal, which dates from the beginning of the 20th century.
Palacio Nacional
National Theatre of Panama
Panama Canal Museum
Palacio Bolívar
Góngora House
Plaza Bolívar
Plaza Herrera
Plaza de Francia
Plaza de la Independencia

Gallery

References

External links 
  

Panama City
History of Panama City
Historic districts
Populated places in Panamá Province
Spanish Colonial architecture
World Heritage Sites in Panama
Tourist attractions in Panama City